The Women's 200 metre individual medley SM10 event at the 2018 Commonwealth Games was held on 7 April at the Gold Coast Aquatic Centre.

Schedule
The schedule is as follows:

All times are Australian Eastern Standard Time (UTC+10)

Results

Heat 1

Heat 2

Final

References

Women's 200 metre individual medley SM10
Common